Gonomyodes is a genus of crane fly in the family Limoniidae.

Distribution
All are North American, with the exception of G. similissimus from Kazakhstan.

Species
G. crickmeri (Alexander, 1949)
G. knowltonius (Alexander, 1948)
G. similissimus Savchenko, 1980
G. tacoma (Alexander, 1949)
G. yohoensis (Alexander, 1952)

References

Limoniidae
Nematocera genera
Diptera of Asia
Diptera of North America